Beneath the Black Palms is the fifth studio album by American electronica band Blaqk Audio, consisting of Davey Havok and Jade Puget of AFI. The album was released on August 21, 2020. Ahead of the album, the duo released "Consort".

Background 
Beneath the Black Palms, released just a year-and-a-half after their fourth album, Only Things We Love, has been described by Havok as "a bird sister" to the previous album. Havok said the album is about "is an affirmation, exaltation, and momentary illumination of rich, arcane shadows fortified by blinding and rapturous light says".

Release and promotion 
On July 24, 2020, Blaqk Audio released a cryptic teaser video on their Instagram page. This was revealed on July 28 to be promotion for the band's fifth album, Beneath the Black Palms, which was released on August 21, 2020. The same day, the band surprise-released a digital EP consisting of the album's first 5 songs, titled Beneath the Black Palms (Side A), which was followed shortly by a visualizer video for the song "Hiss".

Track listing

Personnel 
Davey Havok – lead vocals, lyricist
Jade Puget – keyboard, synthesizer, backing vocals, composer

References 

2020 albums
Blaqk Audio albums
BMG Rights Management albums